The Crossing of the Red Sea may refer to:

Crossing the Red Sea, a biblical event
Crossing of the Red Sea (Bronzino), a 1542 painting
The Crossing of the Red Sea (Poussin), a c. 1633–1634 painting
The Crossing of the Red Sea (Sistine Chapel), a c. 1481–1482 fresco attributed to Cosimo Rosselli